Meanie may refer to:

 Meanie (snack), a brand of snack food
 Meanie, a childish insult describing a mean person, eg "You're a rotten meanie!"

See also
 Blue Meanie (disambiguation)